WWON-FM (100.7 FM) is a radio station licensed to serve Waynesboro, Tennessee, United States.  The station is owned by Jukebox Media.  The station has an oldies format, which is simulcast on sister WWON AM 930.

Sale of the station
In January 2014 Jukebox Media filed a $200,000 deal to purchase the station from Flinn Broadcasting.  The deal was completed on April 7, 2014.

References

External links
Coverage Map for WWON-FM

2011 establishments in Tennessee
Oldies radio stations in the United States
Radio stations established in 2011
WON-FM
Wayne County, Tennessee